In geometry, the small dodecicosahedron (or small dodekicosahedron) is a nonconvex uniform polyhedron, indexed as U50. It has 32 faces (20 hexagons and 12 decagons), 120 edges, and 60 vertices. Its vertex figure is a crossed quadrilateral.

Related polyhedra
It shares its vertex arrangement with the great stellated truncated dodecahedron. It additionally shares its edges with the small icosicosidodecahedron (having the hexagonal faces in common) and the small ditrigonal dodecicosidodecahedron (having the decagonal faces in common).

References

External links
 

Uniform polyhedra